Hayhurst is a neighborhood in the southwest section of Portland, Oregon, on the border with (and in some areas slightly extending into) Washington County.  It borders Raleigh Hills and Beaverton (on the west), and the Portland neighborhoods of Bridlemile (on the north), Hillsdale (on the east), and Maplewood and Multnomah (on the south).

The community of Vermont Hills lies within the neighborhood.

In the western part of the neighborhood is Alpenrose Dairy (1916), a community institution featuring a velodrome, baseball park, and replica Western frontier town ("Dairyville").

Pendleton Park (1955) is a green space with a playground, a baseball diamond, the Vermont Hills Community Garden, and an 8-foot rabbit entitled Vincent, Waiting for Alice.  It is adjacent to Hayhurst Elementary School.

References

External links
 Guide to Hayhurst Neighborhood (PortlandNeighborhood.com)

Neighborhoods in Portland, Oregon